Kenneth Oliver is a Baltimore County resident and Councilman of the Fourth District in Baltimore County, Maryland  The fourth district includes parts of western Baltimore County, including Randallstown and the Security Road corridor.

Education
Oliver's holds a B.S. from the University of Baltimore and an MBA from Morgan State University.  He eventually became an assistant professor at Coppin State College in Baltimore.

Criminal Record
In July, 2009, Oliver pleaded guilty to two theft charges related to campaign finance.

References

People from Baltimore County, Maryland
Morgan State University alumni
University of Baltimore alumni
Living people
Politicians from Baltimore
Maryland politicians convicted of crimes
Year of birth missing (living people)